This is a list of newspapers in El Salvador.
 Diario El Salvador (San Salvador)
 Diario Co Latino (San Salvador)
 El Diario de Hoy (San Salvador)
 El Faro
 El Mundo (El Salvador) (San Salvador) 
 La Prensa Grafica (San Salvador)

See also
 List of newspapers

Further reading

External links
  Newspapers from El Salvador
  Newspapers from El Salvador
 
 
 

El Salvador
Newspapers